William Christie Samuels is a New York City-based Democrat, businessman, founder and chairman of the board of the good government group EffectiveNY and the EffectiveNY Howard Samuels Policy Center. He has recently been awarded the 2017 Center for Popular Democracy Social Justice Award. He was also a host of Effective Radio on AM 970 The Answer, a monthly, two-hour program aimed at enacting major statewide policy changes. This included advocating for a constitutional right to clean air and water, term limits for Albany County Government, a new approach to drug addiction and marijuana legalization, and educating New Yorkers on a "People's Convention."

Samuels has been active in politics since organizing against the Vietnam War in the 1970s. In his business career, he built ACTV, Inc. which developed patents for interactive television. The company was sold to an affiliate of Liberty Media. He also recently sold his Silicon Valley technology company, Resonant Software, to iPipeline.

Early life and background 
Samuels was raised in upstate New York in Canandaigua, the son of Howard and Barbara Samuels. His father Howard J. Samuels served as U.S. Under Secretary of Commerce under President Lyndon B. Johnson and was Director of the Small Business Administration and founded Kordite, now known as Pactive. In 1974, his father ran for Governor with Mario Cuomo as his Lieutenant Governor ultimately losing to Hugh Carey.

Samuels was active in his father's campaign as a young adult. Bill Samuels attended MIT where he earned undergraduate degrees in political science, economics, and engineering. He later graduated from Harvard Law School.

Samuels founded education company, APC Skills, for entry level workers, with divisions in Brazil, Europe, Mexico, and Asia.  In 1987 APC Skills merged with the Alexander Proudfoot company. In 1988, it became a publicly traded company on the London exchange (symbol MMC). Subsequently, he built ACTV, a public company on the NASDAQ (symbol IATV)  which was responsible for 50 patents on intellectual property specifically for interactive television which led to a sale of the company to an affiliate of Liberty Media.

1970s activism 

In 1971, Samuels became involved in the anti-war movement and raised money for the 1971 Vietnam Veterans Against the War March on Washington. Samuels participated in a lawsuit against the 1972 Democratic National Convention along with Shirley Chisholm and others, that argued that the one man, one vote Supreme Court ruling required one Democrat, one-vote apportionment of delegates at the 1972 Democratic National Convention. The lawsuit failed. He was also a founding member of the Council on Economic Priorities (CEP) which was involved with promoting social investment.

Political career

Legal advocacy 
Samuels filed a civil rights lawsuit against the Gramercy Park Trust in 2001 after groups of fourth and fifth graders were removed from the park. The lawsuit ended with a large financial settlement for the students for the treatment they had received.

New York State Senate Democratic campaign 

Samuels founded the Blue Tiger Democrats in 2004, a research project that did projects in Michigan and New York on how to use civic engagement to reconnect the Democratic Party to its communities between election cycles. In 2005 Samuels turned his attention to reforming Albany and provided the initial funding for a liberal blog that runs issue and advocacy campaigns known as the Albany Project.

In 2006 and 2007, Samuels was a speaker at the Milken Institute Global Conference. His speeches focused on how to make political parties and the process more respected.

In 2006, he was named by Eliot Spitzer as Vice Finance Chairman for the New York Democratic Senate Campaign Committee, and became Chairman in 2008, regaining control of the New York State Senate for the Democratic Party for the first time in decades. However, the new Democratic leadership soon lost their majority when Democratic Senator Pedro Espada defected to the Republican Party.

2010 Lieutenant Governor campaign 

In April 2010, Bill Samuels announced his campaign for lieutenant governor, independent of Andrew Cuomo. Samuels' goal was to leverage the position's ceremonial role as State Senate President to achieve what he believed to be fundamental change in Albany through pillars of reform: Fiscal reform, Redistricting reform, Campaign finance reform, ethics reform.

However, after discussions with the Andrew Cuomo campaign, and Cuomo's promise to change the old culture of how Albany was run and to support an early Constitutional Convention vote in 2011, Samuels ended his campaign in order to focus his energy on his effort to oust corrupt Senator Pedro Espada and bring reform to Albany. Nevertheless, Cuomo kept none of his promises.

Independent Expenditure Committee  

Samuels formed the New Roosevelt Initiative, an independent expenditure committee concerned with New York's fiscal practices, ethics rules, redistricting policies, and campaign finance practices. In 2009, New Roosevelt hired Benjamin Kallos, now a New York City Councilman, as executive director.

Samuels and New Roosevelt were among the first to call for unity behind Gustavo Rivera who he endorsed in July 2010. New Roosevelt opened an office in the Bronx, built a field organization, did eight direct mailings and organized a large get out the vote effort. On September 15, 2010, Gustavo Rivera defeated the disgraced incumbent Espada by a margin of nearly 2 to 1. Since the election, Senator Pedro Espada has been convicted of civil and criminal charges.

Common Cause honored him with the Common Cause Democracy in Action award at their annual awards dinner on Tuesday November 29, 2011.

Constitutional change 
In January 2012, Samuels, concerned with what he believed to be Cuomo's lack of commitment to fundamentally changing how Albany functions, launched the Citizens Committee for an Effective Constitution at EffectiveNY.org that was devoted to raising awareness of New York State constitutional changes that he believed would increase transparency and end corrupt practices. EffectiveNY.org focuses on a wide range of needed reforms from high-profile issues like campaign finance and redistricting to those that are often unknown but equally important, like the message of necessity.

The effort was bipartisan, with Samuels, an active Democrat, teaming up with Republican Assembly Minority Leader Brian Kolb and Professor Gerald Benjamin from SUNY New Paltz. In 2017 the voters will decide if there should be a Constitutional Convention.

Samuels’ father, Howard Samuels, had created a similar bi-partisan organization by the same name in 1965 that proposed many of the same recommendations for reform that remain undone today.

In preparation for the 2017 referendum on a Constitutional Convention, Samuels started www.nypeoplesconvention.org, a website dedicated to mobilizing voters to change a "badly antiquated constitution." The website features analyzes of numerous reforms that Samuels believes needs to be added to the state's constitution.

Redistricting 

Samuels helped finance a losing lawsuit to challenge the constitutionality of the gerrymandered New York State Senate lines following the 2000 Census.

2014 Lieutenant Governor campaign 
In an effort to get Cuomo to endorse progressive stands, Samuels announced in 2014 he was mulling another bid for Lieutenant Governor against Kathy Hochul, who if elected would be the first Democratic woman elected to the post in decades, an announcement which drew consternation from several elected female Democratic lawmakers. Hochul was the running mate of incumbent Governor of New York Andrew Cuomo.

Samuels said of Governor Cuomo, "When history is written, he'll just be a mediocre governor that had a Nixon personality." In June 2014 Samuels announced he would not be a candidate for Lieutenant Governor.

Effective Radio 
In 2015, Samuels began hosting a radio program on AM 970 The Answer. The program began as a one-hour weekly series, and has since moved to a two-hour per month format, with each episode focusing on a major issue of the state constitution that a "People's Convention" should address.

Personal life 
Samuels currently partners with this brother Howard C. Samuels in his drug treatment center in Los Angeles, known as the Hills Treatment Center.

Samuels lives with his wife, Marie, in Newport, Rhode Island.].

See also
Going Upriver: The Long War of John Kerry
Milken Institute Global Conference

References

External links
 New Roosevelt
 The Hills Treatment Center
 EffectiveNY

1943 births
New York (state) Democrats
American chief executives
Businesspeople from Rochester, New York
Businesspeople from New York City
Massachusetts Institute of Technology alumni
Living people
Harvard Law School alumni
Activists from New York City